The 1927 San Diego State Aztecs football team represented San Diego State Teachers College during the 1927 NCAA football season.

San Diego State competed in the Southern California Intercollegiate Athletic Conference (SCIAC). The 1927 San Diego State team was led by head coach Charles E. Peterson in his seventh season as football coach of the Aztecs. They played three home games at Balboa Stadium and one at a field on the school campus. The Aztecs finished the season with four wins and three losses (4–3, 2–3 SCIAC). Overall, the team outscored its opponents 190–79 points for the season.

Schedule

Notes

References

San Diego State
San Diego State Aztecs football seasons
San Diego State Aztecs football